José Mello (born 20 May 1895, date of death unknown) was a Brazilian sports shooter. He competed in the 50 m rifle event at the 1936 Summer Olympics.

References

1895 births
Year of death missing
Brazilian male sport shooters
Olympic shooters of Brazil
Shooters at the 1936 Summer Olympics
Place of birth missing